Maurice de Germiny (born 23 November 1939) has been the bishop of Blois from 1997 to 2014. He hails from a French aristocratic family. One of his ancestors was a French ambassador to the Sublime Porte in the sixteenth century.

He qualified as an archivist at the Ecole des Chartes in Paris, and became responsible for the departmental archives of the Jura. He subsequently trained for the ministry and became curate of Saint-Séverin, a Left Bank parish of Paris. He was later named vicar general of Paris.

References

External links
Catholic Hierarchy page 

1939 births
École Nationale des Chartes alumni
Living people
Bishops of Blois
French archivists
21st-century Roman Catholic bishops in France